Fares Hamdi (born 17 April 1980) is a Paralympian athlete from Tunisia competing mainly in category F37 long jump events.

Fares has competed in three Paralympic Games, winning a medal at each one, always in a different event. His first success came in 2000 in Sydney when he won the F37 long jump as well as competing in the T37 long jump. In his third games in 2008 he again failed in the long jump but this time was part of the bronze medal-winning T35-38 4 × 100 m team from Tunisia.

References

External links
 

1980 births
Living people
Tunisian long jumpers
Paralympic athletes of Tunisia
Paralympic gold medalists for Tunisia
Paralympic bronze medalists for Tunisia
Athletes (track and field) at the 2000 Summer Paralympics
Athletes (track and field) at the 2004 Summer Paralympics
Athletes (track and field) at the 2008 Summer Paralympics
Medalists at the 2000 Summer Paralympics
Medalists at the 2004 Summer Paralympics
Medalists at the 2008 Summer Paralympics
Paralympic medalists in athletics (track and field)
Tunisian male sprinters
20th-century Tunisian people
21st-century Tunisian people